Branston Booths is a small village in the North Kesteven district of Lincolnshire, England.

Branston Booths is part of Branston and Mere civil parish.

A church mission hall with seating for over 500 was built at Branston Booths in 1931. A Methodist chapel with seating for 110 was built to the south-west of the village at Branston Moor in 1911.

History
Neolithic axes and arrowheads have been found in Branston Booths, as well as Bronze Age socketed axes and round barrows.

Branston Booths and Potterhanworth Booths were both settled by the Romans. At Branston Booths, remains of a Roman villa(s) and tile kiln were found, as well as tracks, pottery, coins and building debris.

References

External links

Villages in Lincolnshire
North Kesteven District